Marc Allison Veasey (born January 3, 1971) is an American politician serving as a member of the United States House of Representatives for Texas's 33rd congressional district. From 2005 to 2013, he was a member of the Texas House of Representatives, where he served as chair pro tempore of the House Democratic Caucus.

Early life and education
Veasey was born on January 3, 1971, to Connie and Joseph Veasey. With his parents and brother, Ryan, Veasey and his family lived in numerous rental houses in the Stop Six neighborhood of Fort Worth, Texas. When he was ten years old, his parents divorced, and Marc, Ryan and their mother moved in with their maternal grandmother in the Como neighborhood of Fort Worth.

Veasey attended Arlington Heights High School in Fort Worth. He graduated from Texas Wesleyan University with a Bachelor of Arts in mass communications.

Early career 
Veasey worked as a substitute teacher and sportswriter, as well as writing scripts for an advertising agency. One summer, he volunteered for U.S. Representative Martin Frost, and was hired as a field representative. Veasey worked for Frost for five years.

Texas House of Representatives

Elections
As a result of the 2003 Texas redistricting, Frost lost his reelection effort in 2004 to Pete Sessions. In 2004, Veasey challenged Democratic State Representative Glenn Lewis for Texas's 95th House district. He defeated Lewis 54%-46% in the primary and won the general election unopposed. He was reelected in 2006 (91%), 2008 (96%), and 2010 (100%).

Tenure
Veasey represented Texas House District 95 from 2005 to 2013. He was the chair pro tempore of the House Democratic Caucus. He sponsored measures to create career and technology training in high schools, and authored HB 62, which honored Tim Cole, a Texas Tech University student wrongly convicted of raping a fellow student in 1985. Veasey also authored a bill requiring a study to lead to greater enforcement of the James Byrd Jr. hate crime bill.

Committee assignments
Elections Committee
Environmental Regulation Committee
Pensions, Investments, and Financial Services Committee
Redistricting Committee
Voter Identification & Voter Fraud Select Committee (Vice Chair)

U.S. House of Representatives

Elections

2012 
Veasey declared his candidacy for Texas's 33rd congressional district, a new congressional district for the United States House of Representatives that was created by reapportionment following the 2010 United States census. The district is based in Tarrant and Dallas counties. It is heavily Democratic: the Cook Partisan Voting Index (PVI) was D+14. It is also highly diverse: 66% Hispanic and 17% African American.

Eleven candidates filed to run in the Democratic primary. Veasey finished first, with 37% of the vote, less than the 50% needed to win the primary outright. State Representative Domingo García ranked second with 25% of the vote, qualifying for the runoff election. Veasey won Tarrant with 49% of the vote, while Garcia won Dallas with 44% of the vote. In the runoff, Veasey defeated Garcia, 53%-47%. He carried Tarrant with a 68% of the vote, as opposed to Garcia's 70% in Dallas. In the general election, he defeated Republican Chuck Bradley, 73%-26%. He won Tarrant with 78% of the vote and Dallas with 66% of the vote. Veasey is the first African-American U.S. Representative elected from Tarrant County.

2014 

Veasey won re-nomination in the March 4 primary, defeating Tom Sanchez, 13,285 votes (73.5%) to 4,797 (26.5%). He faced no Republican opponent in the general election but Jason Reeves qualified for the ballot as a Libertarian.

2016
Veasey won re-nomination in the March 1 primary against activist Carlos Quintanilla with 63% of the vote. He lost Dallas County but won Tarrant County. He defeated Republican M. Mark Mitchell in the general election, 74% to 26%. Veasey spent $1.5 million on his campaign.

2018
Veasey again defeated Quintanilla in the primary, with 70% of the vote. In the general election he defeated Republican Willie Billups and Libertarian Jason Reeves with 76%.

2020 
Veasey defeated Sean Segura in the primary, 64% to 36%. He was endorsed by the Dallas Morning News, which claimed Segura "lacks a cohesive knowledge of the district’s public policy needs."

In the general election, Veasey beat Republican Fabian Cordova Vasquez and three minor candidates, including Quintanilla, with 67% of the vote, his weakest showing to date, largely due to Quintanilla's independent candidacy.

Political positions

Civil rights
Veasey is a supporter of a woman's right to choose.

Veasey voted for the Violence Against Women Act and was rated the "preferred" candidate in 2020 by Feminist Majority Foundation. He co-sponsored the Student Non-Discrimination Act.

Energy and oil
Veasey has joined the Heritage Foundation and opposed the Sierra Club on Offshore oil and gas in the Gulf of Mexico.

Veasey defended Texas oil and interests in February 2021 when President Joe Biden canceled the Keystone XL pipeline and issued a moratorium on new oil and gas leases on federal lands and waters.

Committee assignments
Committee on Armed Services
Subcommittee on Strategic Forces
Subcommittee on Tactical Air and Land Forces
Committee on Science, Space and Technology
Subcommittee on Energy
Subcommittee on Space

Caucus memberships
Congressional Black Caucus
LGBT Equality Caucus
Congressional Arts Caucus
Blue Collar Caucus
Congressional NextGen 9-1-1 Caucus
U.S.-Japan Caucus
New Democrat Coalition
Medicare for All Caucus

Personal life
Veasey is married to Tonya Jackson, a former Texas Senate aide. They have a son. Veasey's uncle, Robert James English, was a television reporter and worked for Jim Wright, a former Speaker of the United States House of Representatives.

Electoral history

See also
List of African-American United States representatives

References

External links

Congressman Marc Veasey official U.S. House website
Marc Veasey for Congress

Profile at the Texas Tribune
Profile at TexasDirectory.com
Profile at Vote-TX.org

|-

|-

1971 births
21st-century American politicians
African-American members of the United States House of Representatives
African-American state legislators in Texas
Democratic Party members of the United States House of Representatives from Texas
Living people
Democratic Party members of the Texas House of Representatives
People from Fort Worth, Texas
Texas Wesleyan University alumni
21st-century African-American politicians
20th-century African-American people